Scheienkopf is a mountain on the border of Liechtenstein and Austria, although the summit is in Austria, in the Rätikon range of the Eastern Alps with a height of .

The mountain is located in the eastern part of Liechtenstein. To the east of the capital - Vaduz, at its foot lies the commune-community Balzers (its pre-Austrian enclave). The top of the mountain is already listed on the territory of Austria.

References
 
 

Mountains of the Alps
Mountains of Liechtenstein
Mountains of Vorarlberg
Austria–Liechtenstein border
International mountains of Europe